Traill County is a county in the U.S. state of North Dakota. As of the 2020 census listed the population at 7,997. Its county seat is Hillsboro, and its largest city is Mayville.

History
The Dakota Territory legislature created the county on January 12, 1875, with areas partitioned from Burbank (now Barnes), Cass, and Grand Forks counties. It was named for Walter John Strickland Traill, an employee of the Hudson's Bay Company and son of Canadian pioneer Catharine Parr Traill. The first county building was a small single-story building in Caledonia. Several replacement courthouses were built during the late 19th century and several votes to move the county seat to Mayville narrowly failed. Efforts to move the county seat to Hillsboro were more successful, and all county records were moved there in 1890. Construction of the current county building began in 1905; it is now listed on the National Register of Historic Places.

The county boundaries were altered in 1881 and in 1883. It has maintained its current configuration since 1883.

Geography
Traill County lies on the east side of North Dakota. Its east boundary line abuts the west boundary line of the state of Minnesota (across the Red River). The Goose River flows eastward through the center of the county to discharge into the Red. The northward-flowing Red River forms the eastern boundary line of the county on its way to the Hudson Bay, and the Elk River flows south-southeastward through the southwestern part of the county. The county terrain consists of rolling hills, devoted to agriculture. The terrain slopes to the east and north, with its highest point on the lower western boundary line, at 1,201' (366m) ASL.

Major highways
  Interstate 29
  North Dakota Highway 18
  North Dakota Highway 200

Airports
 Hillsboro Municipal Airport (3H4)
 Mayville Municipal Airport (D56)

Adjacent counties

 Grand Forks County - north
 Polk County, Minnesota - northeast
 Norman County, Minnesota - east
 Cass County - south
 Steele County - west

Demographics

2000 census
As of the 2020 census, there were 8,477 people, 3,341 households, and 2,231 families in the county. The population density was 9.83/sqmi (3.80/km2). There were 3,708 housing units at an average density of 4.30/sqmi 1.66/km2). The racial makeup of the county was 97.31% White, 0.11% Black or African American, 0.94% Native American, 0.15% Asian, 0.01% Pacific Islander, 0.96% from other races, and 0.52% from two or more races. 2.18% of the population were Hispanic or Latino of any race. 58.9% were of Norwegian and 20.6% German ancestry.

There were 3,341 households, out of which 30.9% had children under the age of 18 living with them, 58.0% were married couples living together, 5.4% had a female householder with no husband present, and 33.2% were non-families. 29.3% of all households were made up of individuals, and 15.10% had someone living alone who was 65 years of age or older. The average household size was 2.41 and the average family size was 3.00.

The county population contained 24.8% under the age of 18, 9.7% from 18 to 24, 24.8% from 25 to 44, 21.6% from 45 to 64, and 19.1% who were 65 years of age or older. The median age was 39 years. For every 100 females there were 100.8 males. For every 100 females age 18 and over, there were 97.9 males.

The median income for a household in the county was $37,445, and the median income for a family was $45,852. Males had a median income of $30,138 versus $20,583 for females. The per capita income for the county was $18,014. About 6.4% of families and 9.2% of the population were below the poverty line, including 9.6% of those under age 18 and 8.1% of those age 65 or over.

2010 census
As of the 2010 census, there were 8,121 people, 3,394 households, and 2,150 families in the county. The population density was 9.42/sqmi (3.71/km2). There were 3,780 housing units at an average density of 4.39/sqmi (1.73/km2). The racial makeup of the county was 96.2% white, 0.8% American Indian, 0.5% black or African American, 0.3% Asian, 1.1% from other races, and 1.2% from two or more races. Those of Hispanic or Latino origin made up 2.6% of the population. In terms of ancestry, 53.2% were Norwegian, 38.1% were German, 5.9% were Irish, and 2.6% were American.

Of the 3,394 households, 27.6% had children under the age of 18 living with them, 54.2% were married couples living together, 6.2% had a female householder with no husband present, 36.7% were non-families, and 31.3% of all households were made up of individuals. The average household size was 2.29 and the average family size was 2.88. The median age was 42.6 years.

The median income for a household in the county was $44,290 and the median income for a family was $60,054. Males had a median income of $39,846 versus $28,378 for females. The per capita income for the county was $23,340. About 4.6% of families and 9.2% of the population were below the poverty line, including 10.9% of those under age 18 and 11.1% of those age 65 or over.

Communities

Cities

 Buxton
 Clifford
 Galesburg
 Grandin (part)
 Hatton
 Hillsboro (county seat)
 Mayville
 Portland
 Reynolds (part)

Census-designated places
 Blanchard
 Caledonia

Unincorporated communities
 Cummings

Townships

 Belmont
 Bingham
 Blanchard
 Bloomfield
 Bohnsack
 Buxton
 Caledonia
 Eldorado
 Elm River
 Ervin
 Galesburg
 Garfield
 Greenfield
 Herberg
 Hillsboro
 Kelso
 Lindaas
 Mayville
 Morgan
 Norman
 Norway
 Roseville
 Stavanger
 Viking
 Wold

Politics
Traill County voters lean Republican. In only two national elections since 1964 has the county selected the Democratic Party candidate.

See also
 KVLY-TV mast
 KRDK-TV mast
 National Register of Historic Places listings in Traill County, North Dakota

Notes

External links
 Traill County official website
 Traill County Economic Development Commission website 
 Centennial of Traill County, 1875-1975 from the Digital Horizons website
 Traill County map, North Dakota DOT

 
1875 establishments in Dakota Territory
Populated places established in 1875